#Luimelia is a Spanish lesbian romance web television series starring Paula Usero and Carol Rovira. It began airing on Atresplayer Premium on 14 February 2020.

Premise 
#Luimelia is a spin-off of the period serial drama Amar es para siempre. It rescues two iconic characters, the lesbian couple formed by Luisita and Amelia, and transfers them forward from the late 1970s to current day, while being played by the same actresses. The project was driven by the strong momentum of fandom's shipping behind the two characters in the period drama series.

Cast 
Starring
 Paula Usero as Luisita Gómez.
 Carol Rovira as Amelia Ledesma.
Other

Production and release 
#Luimelia is based on an original idea by Camino Sánchez, Borja González Santaolalla and Diana Rojo. Produced by Atresmedia and Diagonal TV, the filming of the series began in Madrid by November 2019. Montse García, Francisco Sierra, Lucía Alonso-Allende and Ignacio García Alonso were credited as executive producers and Borja González Santaolalla as director.
The first season premiered on Atresplayer Premium on 14 February 2020. The second season began airing on 16 August 2020, whereas the third season began airing on 17 January 2021. Consisting of 8 episodes, season 4 features an extended running time of around 30 minutes per episode. Its premiere date is slated for 25 July 2021.

Season 1

Season 2

Season 3

Season 4

Awards and nominations 

|-
| align = "center" | 2020 || 4th  || colspan = "2" | Best Short Series ||  || align = "center" | 
|-
| align = "center" | 2021 || 32nd GLAAD Media Awards || colspan = "2" rowspan = "2" | Outstanding Spanish-Language Scripted Television Series ||  || 
|-
| align = "center" | 2022 || 33rd GLAAD Media Awards ||  || 
|}

References 

2020 Spanish television series debuts
Lesbian-related television shows
2020s romance television series
Atresplayer Premium original programming
Television shows filmed in Spain
2020s LGBT-related drama television series
2020s Spanish drama television series
Spanish LGBT-related television shows
Spanish-language television shows